Great Coastal Railway Journeys is a BBC documentary series produced by Naked and presented by Michael Portillo, a former Conservative MP and Minister of State for Transport.

Following the format of Great British Railway Journeys and related series with Portillo as presenter, each episode features a coastal railway journey through England, Scotland, Wales or Ireland.

The first two series were filmed back to back in Summer and Autumn 2021. Series 1 aired on BBC Two in January and February 2022. Series 2 will air soon.

Portillo has also presented 7 other programmes with a similar format: Great Continental Railway Journeys (7 series; 2012–2020), Great American Railroad Journeys (4 series; 2016–2020), Great Indian Railway Journeys (2018),  Great Alaskan Railroad Journeys and Great Canadian Railway Journeys (broadcast consecutively in January 2019), Great Australian Railway Journeys (2019), Great Asian Railway Journeys (2020).

Synopsis 
Victorian guidebooks written by George Bradshaw under the title Bradshaw's Guide were the first comprehensive timetable and travel guides to the railway system in Great Britain, which at the time although it had grown to be extensive, still consisted of a number of fragmented and competing railway companies and lines, each publishing their own timetables.

Classified by the BBC in both the travel and history genres, the series features Portillo using the guide to plan his journeys, in the process visiting points of interest picked out in the guide and comparing its content with the modern world, both the physical and cultural ones.

Format 
Each series features Portillo travelling on a different route each week, with each daily episode being one short leg of the journey. The weekly journey is a point-to-point journey to take in a variety of locations along the route. Filmed entirely on location, the series features a mix of Portillo delivering dialogue to camera, as well as performing ad-hoc interviews with members of the public or fellow travellers, in addition to pre-arranged interviews.

Broadcast 
All episodes were originally broadcast on consecutive weekdays on BBC Two and simulcast on BBC Two HD.

Episodes

Series 1 (2022)

Dunbar to Peterhead
The first journey takes Portillo from coast to coast, from Dunbar to Peterhead.

Inverness to Orkney Islands
Portillo's second journey, is from Inverness to the Orkney Islands.

Tynemouth to Berwick-upon-Tweed
Portillo's third journey takes him across North East England, from Tynemouth to Berwick-upon-Tweed.

Fairlie to Isle of Lewis and Harris
In his fourth journey, Portillo explores the west coast of Scotland, starting in Fairlie and finishing in Lewis and Harris.

Avonmouth to Fishguard
Portillo's fifth journey takes him along Wales' southern coastline, beginning in Avonmouth and ending in Fishguard.

See also
 Great Railway Journeys

Notes

References

External links

2022 British television series debuts
2020s British documentary television series
2020s British travel television series
BBC television documentaries
BBC travel television series
Documentary television series about railway transport
Rail transport in Great Britain
Television series by Fremantle (company)
Television shows set in England
Television shows set in London
Television shows set in Northern Ireland
Television shows set in Scotland
Television shows set in Wales